Five vessels of the Royal Navy have been named HMS Harlequin.

 was a schooner of 14 guns, purchased in 1796 and still listed in 1802.
 was an American gunboat captured at the Battle of Lake Borgne on 14 December 1814. Lieutenant James Hunter, who had been wounded at the battle, was appointed to command her with a commission dated 27 February 1815, and she was paid off in June 1815. The Admiralty formally purchased her in 1815 in the West Indies and she was still listed as a tender in Bermuda in 1816. Prize money for her and the other vessels captured at the battle was paid in July 1821.
 was a brig-sloop of 16 guns launched in 1836, converted to a coal hulk in 1860 and sold in 1889.
HMS Harlequin was a wood screw sloop of 950 tons burthen (bm), laid down at Portsmouth Dockyard on 13 February 1861 and cancelled on 16 February 1864.

The Royal Navy also employed a hired armed ship  in 1804; she was wrecked on 7 December 1809.

Citations and references
Citations

References

O'Byrne, William R. (1849) A Naval Biographical Dictionary: comprising the life and services of every living officer in Her Majesty's navy, from the rank of admiral of the fleet to that of lieutenant, inclusive. (London: J. Murray), vol. 1.
Paullin, Charles Oscar and Frederic Logan Paxson (1914) Guide to the materials in London archives for the history of the United States since 1783. (Carnegie Institution of Washington).

Royal Navy ship names